The Terror is a 1938 British crime film directed by Richard Bird and starring Wilfrid Lawson, Linden Travers and Bernard Lee. It was based on the 1927 play The Terror by Edgar Wallace (which was adapted from Wallace's 1926 story The Black Abbot). The play had previously been adapted as an American film The Terror in 1928.

It was shot at Elstree Studios with sets designed by the art director Cedric Dawe.

Plot summary 
A group of criminals carry out a daring robbery of an armoured van. Two of the criminals are betrayed by the mastermind of the operation. After ten years in prison, they come out and search for the man behind the crimes who betrayed them. But the police are on their tail also wanting to find out who was behind the robbery.

Cast 
Wilfrid Lawson as Mr. Goodman
Bernard Lee as Ferdy Fane
Arthur Wontner as Colonel Redmayne
Linden Travers as Mary Redmayne
Henry Oscar as Joe Connor
Iris Hoey as Mrs. Elvery
Stanley Lathbury as Hawkins, the Butler
Lesley Wareing as Veronica Elvery
Alastair Sim as  "Soapy" Marx
John Turnbull as Superintendent Hallick
Richard Murdoch as Detective Lewis
Edward Lexy as Inspector Dobie
Kathleen Harrison as Gladys, the Maid
Irene Handl as Kitchen Maid

References

Bibliography 
 Goble, Alan. The Complete Index to Literary Sources in Film. Walter de Gruyter, 1999.

External links 

1938 films
British crime films
British mystery films
1930s crime films
Films shot at Associated British Studios
British black-and-white films
British films based on plays
1930s mystery films
Films set in London
1930s English-language films
1930s British films